Colgin Hill is a historic house in Gainesville, Sumter County, Alabama.  The one-story structure began as a log dogtrot house for William Colgin in 1832.  The breezeway was enclosed, creating a center hall, and Greek Revival details added within a couple of decades of the initial construction.  It serves as an example of the transition in Alabama from the frontier to a more refined society.  Historians consider it to be the oldest extant building in Gainesville.  It was added to the National Register of Historic Places on October 3, 1985.

References

National Register of Historic Places in Sumter County, Alabama
Houses on the National Register of Historic Places in Alabama
Dogtrot architecture in Alabama
Greek Revival houses in Alabama
Houses completed in 1832
Houses in Sumter County, Alabama